The city of Houston, Texas, contains many neighborhoods, ranging from planned communities to historic wards. There is no uniform standard for what constitutes an individual neighborhood within the city; however, the city of Houston does recognize a list of 88 super neighborhoods which encompass broadly recognized regions. According to the city, a super neighborhood is a "geographically designated area where residents, civic organizations, institutions and businesses work together to identify, plan, and set priorities to address the needs and concerns of their community."A list of the super neighborhoods, in the numerical order as assigned by the city, is shown below:

In addition to the recognized super neighborhoods, Houston is further divided into a number of other formal and informal regions, including special districts and individual subdivisions. An incomplete list of these communities and jurisdictions is provided below.

Management districts
In Texas, municipal management districts (MMDs) are independent government agencies created by the Texas Legislature to provide an additional layer of funding for infrastructure and public services in urban areas. Since the creation of the management district system in 1999, a variety of MMDs have been established in various business districts and neighborhoods across Houston; these organizations have taken visible roles in "branding" different areas of the city. Management districts are funded by ad valorem taxes on commercial properties within their boundaries.

As of 2016, there are 51 management districts in Greater Houston. An incomplete list is provided below:

Alphabetical list of neighborhoods

A

 Acres Homes
 Addicks
 Afton Oaks
 Aldine
 Alief
 Almeda
 Atascocita
 Audubon Place
 Avenida Houston
 Avondale East

B

 Bay Forest
 Bay Glen
 Bay Knoll
 Barrett Station
 Bear Creek 1 & 2
 Binz
 Blue Ridge
 Bordersville
 Boulevard Oaks
 Braeburn
 Braeswood Place
 Brays Oaks
 Brentwood
 Briar Meadow
 Briargrove
 Briargrove Park
 Briarhills
 Briarmeadow
 Broadacres
 Brooke Smith
 Brookline

C
Camden Park
Camino South
Camp Logan
Candlelight Estates
Candlelight Place
Carverdale
Central City
Champion Forest
Chasewood 
Cherryhurst
Chevy Chase
Chinatown
City Park
CityCentre
Clear Lake City
Clinton Park 
Cloverland
  Cole Creek Manor
Copperfield
Corinthian Pointe
Cottage Grove
Courtlandt Place 
Crestwood / Glen Cove
 Candlelight Forest West

D

 Denver Harbor
 Downtown

E
East Downtown
East End
East Houston
Eastex / Jensen
East Little York / Homestead
Eastwood 
Edgebrook
El Dorado / Oates Prairie
Eldridge / West Oaks
Energy Corridor

F
Fairbanks / Northwest Crossing
Fondren Southwest 
Fifth Ward
First Ward
Forum Park
Fourth Ward
Forest West / Pinemont
Forrest Lake
Foster Place
Frenchtown
Frostwood

G
Garden Oaks 
Garden Villas 
Gaywood
Genoa
Glenbrook Valley
Glenshire
Golfcrest
Greenfield Village
Greenspoint
Greenway Plaza
Greenwood
Gulfgate / Pine Valley
Gulfton
Gulfway Terrace

H
Harrisburg
Heather Glen
Herschellwood
Hidden Valley
Highland Village 
Hillwood
Hiram Clarke
Houston Gardens 
Houston Heights
Humble
Hunters Glen
Hunters Point
Hunterwood
Hyde Park

I

 Idylwood
 Independence Heights
 International District
 Inwood Forest
 Ingrando Park

J

 Jeanetta

K
Kashmere Gardens 
Kingwood
Kleinbrook
Knollwood Village

L
Lake Houston
Lakes of Parkway
Lakewood
Langwood
Larchmont
Lawndale / Wayside
 Lazybrook / Timbergrove
Lindale Park
Link Valley
Linkwood
Little Saigon
Lincoln Greens
Lower Westheimer

M

 Magnolia Grove
 Magnolia Park
 Mahatma Gandhi District
 Manchester
 Maplewood
 Maplewood South–North
 Marilyn Estates
 Meadowcreek Village
 Memorial
 Memorial Bend
 Memorial City
 Memorial Park
 Meyerland
 Midtown
 Montrose
 Moonshine Hill
 Morningside Place
 Museum District
 Museum Park
 Mykawa
 Missouri City

N
Near Northside
Near Northwest
Neartown
North Lindale
Norhill
North Central
North Shore
Northcliffe
Northcliffe Manor
Northfield 
Northline
Northside 
Nottingham Forest
Nottingham West

O
Oak Brook
Oak Estates 
Oak Forest
Oak Manor–University Woods 
Old Braeswood 
Overbrook

P
Paradise Valley
Park Place
Parkway Villages
Pecan Park 
Pierce Junction
Pine Valley
Pleasantville 
Port Houston
Ponderosa Forest
Prestonwood Forest

R
Recreation Acres 
Rice Military 
Rice Village 
Richmond Strip
Ridgegate
Ridgemont
River Oaks
Rivercrest Estates
Riverside Terrace 
Robindell
Royal Oaks Country Club

S

 Sagemont
 Scenic Woods
 Second Ward
 Settegast
 Shady Acres
 Shadyside
 Sharpstown
 Shenandoah
 Shepherd Park Plaza
 Sherwood Forest
 Sherwood Oaks
 Sixth Ward
 Somerset Green
 South Acres
 South Bank
 South Main
 South Park
 South Union
 Southcrest
 Southampton
 Southbelt / Ellington
 Southgate
 Southwest
 Spring Branch
 Spring Lakes
 St. George Place
 Sugar Valley
 Sunnyside
 Sunset Terrace / Montclair

T

 Tanglewood
 Tanglewilde
 Third Ward
 Timbergrove Manor

U 

 University Oaks
 Upper Kirby
 Uptown

V

 Village at Glen Iris

W–Z

Walnut Bend
Washington Avenue
Washington Terrace
West Eleventh Place
West End
West Oaks
Westbury
Westmoreland
Westmoreland Farms
Westwood
Willow Meadows
Willowbend
Willowbrook
Willowick Place
Willowood
Windemere
Windsor Village
Woodland Heights 
Woodland Trails 
Woodshire 
Woodside
Wrenwood
Yellowstone
Yorkshire
Yorkwood

See also

 Geographic areas of Houston
 History of Houston
 Wards of Houston

References

External links
 City of Houston – Super Neighborhoods
 Lane, Chris. "The Changing Face of Houston: The City That Welcomes and Transforms." Houston Press. Tuesday December 16, 2014.

Texas geography-related lists
Lists of neighborhoods in U.S. cities
Neighborhoods